This is a list of all cricketers who have played first-class or List A cricket for West Zone women's cricket team.

A - D 
 Nandita Adhiya
 Ritika Bhopalkar
 Shraddha Chavan
 Neha Chavda
 Reena Dabhi
 Soniya Dabir
 Manali Dakshini
 Nancy Daruwalla
 Shweta Dave
 Anagha Deshpande

G - K 
 Priyanka Garkhede
 Gauri Gokhale
 Rajeshwari Goyal
 Tejal Hasabnis
 Jayshreeba Jadeja
 Mridula Jadeja
 Snehal Jadhav
 Shweta Jadhav
 Shweta Dave 
 MV Joshi
 SS Kadam
 HY Kazi
 TV Khot
 AP Kokil
 SM Koli

L - P 
 Samantha Lobatto
 BK Makhania
 Smriti Mandhana
 SR Mane
 Sulakshana Naik
 Devika Palshikar
 PR Panchal
 Sunetra Paranjpe
 DR Patel
 HA Patel
 NY Patel
 PA Patel
 TN Pathan
 AA Patil
 KD Patil
 PD Pawale
 Snehal Pradhan
 Seema Pujare

R - Y 
 Poonam Raut
 JI Rodriques
 SG Rozario
 SV Sakru
 ND Shahi
 Amrita Shinde
 SS Shinde
 Monica Sumra
 BD Surti
 LJ Tomar
 Devika Vaidya
 RP Yadav

References 

West Zone women cricketers
Lists of women cricketers